Chi si ferma è perduto is a 1960 Italian comedy film directed by Sergio Corbucci. The title is based on a slogan of Benito Mussolini's regime, literally meaning "who stops is lost".

Plot
Two employees at a Naples company engage in a rivalry to see who can succeed their boss.

Cast 
Totò: Antonio Guardalavecchia
Peppino De Filippo: Giuseppe Colabona
Aroldo Tieri: Matteo Rossi
Luigi De Filippo: Donato Cavallo
Alberto Lionello: Mario Rossi
Alberto Talegalli: The client who complains
Angela Portaluri: Iole Guardalavecchia
Mario Castellani: Commendatore Amilcare Pasquetti
Lia Zoppelli: Giulia Pasquetti
Jacqueline Pierreux: Teresa
Luigi Pavese: Cesare Santoro
Anna Campori: Italia
Pietro De Vico: The waiter
Renzo Palmer: Cavicchioni
Marisa Traversi: Adua
Enzo Petito: Napoleone

References

External links

1960 films
1960 comedy films
Films directed by Sergio Corbucci
Italian comedy films
Films set in Naples
Films shot in Rome
Films with screenplays by Giovanni Grimaldi
Films with screenplays by Luciano Martino
Films with screenplays by Bruno Corbucci
Films scored by Gianni Ferrio
1960s Italian films